Mitja Šivic (born October 1, 1979) is a Slovenian ice hockey player. He participated at the 2011 IIHF World Championship as a member of the Slovenia men's national ice hockey team.

References

External links

 Profile at SiOL portal

1979 births
Living people
HKMK Bled players
Brûleurs de Loups players
Diables Rouges de Briançon players
Keramin Minsk players
Kristall Saratov players
LHC Les Lions players
HDD Olimpija Ljubljana players
People from the Municipality of Radovljica
Slovenian ice hockey forwards
THK Tver players
Slovenian expatriate ice hockey people
Slovenian expatriate sportspeople in Russia
Slovenian expatriate sportspeople in Belarus
Slovenian expatriate sportspeople in France
Expatriate ice hockey players in France
Expatriate ice hockey players in Russia
Expatriate ice hockey players in Belarus